The 47th British Academy Film Awards, given by the British Academy of Film and Television Arts in 1994, honoured the best films of 1993.

Steven Spielberg's Schindler's List won the award for Best Film (and previously won the Academy Award for Best Picture). The film also won the awards for Best Director (Spielberg), Supporting Actor (Ralph Fiennes), Adapted Screenplay, Cinematography, Editing and Original Music. Anthony Hopkins won the award for Best Actor (The Remains of the Day) and Holly Hunter was voted Best Actress for her role in The Piano while The Age of Innocence won one award—Best Supporting Actress (Miriam Margolyes). Additionally, Shadowlands was voted Best British Film of 1993.

Winners and nominees

Statistics

See also
 66th Academy Awards
 19th César Awards
 46th Directors Guild of America Awards
 7th European Film Awards
 51st Golden Globe Awards
 5th Golden Laurel Awards
 14th Golden Raspberry Awards
 8th Goya Awards
 9th Independent Spirit Awards
 20th Saturn Awards
 46th Writers Guild of America Awards

References 

Film047
British Academy Film Awards
British Academy Film Awards
April 1994 events in the United Kingdom
1994 in London
1993 awards in the United Kingdom